Helene Johnson (July 7, 1906 – July 7, 1995) was an African-American poet during the Harlem Renaissance. She was also a cousin of writer Dorothy West.

Career
Johnson's literary career began when she won first prize in a short story competition sponsored by the Boston Chronicle. She also received an honorable mention in a poetry contest organized by Opportunity, the journal of the National Urban League that was a leading showcase for the talents of African-American artists.

She reached the height of her popularity in 1927 when her poem "Bottled" was published in the May issue of Vanity Fair. In 1935, Johnson’s last published poems appeared in Challenge: A Literary Quarterly.

She continued to write a poem a day for the rest of her life.

Personal life 
Johnson, whose given name was Helen, spent her early years at her grandfather’s house in Boston. The rest of her formative years were spent in Brookline, Massachusetts.

She and Dorothy West moved to Harlem in the 1920s, where they became friends with such artists as Zora Neale Hurston. Johnson attended Columbia University, but did not graduate.

In 1933, Johnson married William Warner Hubbell III. The couple had one child, Abigail, before divorcing.

Johnson died in Manhattan at the age of 88.

References

Shockley, Ann Allen. African-American Women Writers 1746-1933: An Anthology and Critical Guide. New Haven, Connecticut: Meridian Books.
Patton, Venetria K., Maureen Honey.  Double Take: A Revisionist Harlem Renaissance Anthology. Rutgers University Press (2001).

External links
Review of This Waiting for Love by Helene Johnson, Poet of the Harlem Renaissance
Article by poet Rita Dove, 2000
 AA Registry Entry for Helene Johnson.
Essential Poems (To Fall in Love With) by Daisy Goodwin (contains Helene Johnson's poem, "Futility")
Article by Linda Lewis

1906 births
1995 deaths
People from Brookline, Massachusetts
African-American poets
American women poets
20th-century American poets
20th-century American women writers
20th-century African-American women writers
20th-century African-American writers